NGC 82 is a magnitude 14.8 star located in the Andromeda constellation. It was first recorded by French astronomer Guillaume Bigourdan on October 23, 1884.

References

External links 
 

0082
Andromeda (constellation)
18841023
Discoveries by Guillaume Bigourdan